Vitali Stanislavovich Trofimenko (born 25 December 1970) is a former Russian football player and referee.

External links
 

1970 births
Living people
Soviet footballers
FC Kuban Krasnodar players
Russian footballers
FC Lada-Tolyatti players
FC Rostov players
Russian Premier League players
Russian football referees
Association football defenders
FC Uralets Nizhny Tagil players